Santana is a town and municipality in the Ricaurte Province, in the north of the Colombian department of Boyacá. Santana borders Chitaraque and the Santander Department in the east, Güepsa, Santander in the west, Suaita, Santander in the north and Chitaraque and San José de Pare in the south.

Etymology 
Santana was called Santa Ana de Vélez until the end of the nineteenth century. Later, it was shortened to Santana.

History 
The region of Santana before the Spanish conquest of the Muisca, was an important cotton-growing area. The Guane and through trade also the Muisca, made mantles and small cloths used as money from the plant. Santana was located between the terrains led by the major cacique of Vélez and Chitaraque. Conquistador Martín Galeano founded the modern town of Vélez on June 3, 1539. Santa Ana was visited by evangelisers at the end of 1692 for the first time, 75 years after the installation of the encomienda of Santa Ana de Vélez. Modern Santana, then still called Santa Ana, was founded by viceroy Antonio José Amar y Borbón on June 14, 1806.

Economy 
The basis for the economy of Santana is the cultivation of sugarcane, to produce panela. Also coffee is grown in Santana.

References 

Municipalities of Boyacá Department
Populated places established in 1806
1806 establishments in the Spanish Empire